The 1946 Western Reserve Red Cats football team represented the Western Reserve University, now known as Case Western Reserve University, in the Mid-America Conference during the 1946 college football season. The team was coached by Tom Davies, assisted by Dick Luther. The featured star player, and future NFL Pro Bowler, was Warren Lahr. Two other notables players were George Roman and Stan Skoczen.

Schedule

References

Western Reserve
Case Western Reserve Spartans football seasons
Western Reserve Red Cats football